Handry Lenzun (born 23 October 1971) is an Indonesian former fencer. He competed in the individual épée event at the 1992 Summer Olympics.

References

External links
 

1971 births
Living people
Indonesian male épée fencers
Olympic fencers of Indonesia
Fencers at the 1992 Summer Olympics
Sportspeople from North Sulawesi
20th-century Indonesian people
21st-century Indonesian people